Gurusamy Govandar a/l Kandasamy (born 11 January 1989) is a Malaysian football player who plays and captains for Malaysia Super League club Petaling Jaya City. Gurusamy plays mainly as a defensive midfielder but can also play as a central midfielder.

Club career

Selangor
For the 2012 Malaysia Super League, Gurusamy officially joined Selangor. He joined the team at the same time that his older brother, Depan Sakwati were transferred from Selangor to Sarawak.

PKNS
On 2 December 2016, it was announced that Gurusamy agreed to join PKNS for the 2017 Malaysia Super League season.

International career
He has played for the Malaysian national football team, and in summer 2009 he played twice against Manchester United in their pre season tour of the Far East. He is a first cousin of Ranjith Gurusamy who plays hurling and football for the Cork senior teams in Ireland and who has represented the Irish national team at underage level.

In November 2010, Gurusamy was called up to the Malaysia national squad by coach K. Rajagopal for the 2010 AFF Suzuki Cup. Malaysia won the 2010 AFF Suzuki Cup title for the first time in their history.

Career statistics

Club

International

Honours

Club
Selangor
Malaysia Cup: 2015

International
Malaysia U-23
 2009 SEA Games: Gold
 2011 SEA Games: Gold

Malaysia
 AFF Suzuki Cup: 2010

References

External links
 
 Profile at Selangor FA Official Website

Malaysian footballers
Malaysia international footballers
Selangor FA players
PKNS F.C. players
Petaling Jaya City FC players
Living people
1989 births
People from Selangor
Malaysian people of Tamil descent
Malaysian sportspeople of Indian descent
Malaysia Super League players
Association football midfielders
Footballers at the 2010 Asian Games
Southeast Asian Games gold medalists for Malaysia
Southeast Asian Games medalists in football
Competitors at the 2009 Southeast Asian Games
Competitors at the 2011 Southeast Asian Games
Asian Games competitors for Malaysia
21st-century Malaysian people